Presuntos Implicados was a Spanish pop band, created in March 1983 in Yecla, Murcia. The band was originally composed of the siblings Sole Giménez and Juan Luis Giménez, and their friend Pablo Gómez. In the same year 1983, they won a radio contest and their first recording, Danzad, Danzad Malditos, appeared one year later under the RCA label. But the record company forced them to write more commercial songs outside their style, and they left in 1986 to work with an independent label, Discos Intermitentes. Pablo Gómez left the group and Javier Vela arrived to replace him.

In 1987, they recorded their De sol a sol album and their song, En la oscuridad (In the darkness) was chosen as best single of the year by RNE. This recording went to be double platinum and allowed them to sign a contract with WEA Records. Javier Vela left and was replaced by Nacho Mañó, who had produced De sol a sol.

They kept releasing recordings, adding more Latino, Brazilian and jazz sounds to their usual pop and funk combination, always led by the characteristic voice of Sole Giménez. The three members of the group control all aspects of their recordings, from the composition, the arrangements to the record production.

In 1995, they gave a big concert in the Palau de la Música in Valencia and it was also recorded into a double live album called "La Noche", which featured a duet between Sole Giménez and Randy Crawford and another one with Ana Torroja (vocalist of the Spanish popgroup Mecano) in her first public appearance after Mecano's first break up, singing with Sole Giménez one of Presuntos' hits "Cada historia".

After a long time with no new material they release "Siete" in 1997, which takes them on a long tour. "Versión Original", their next album, is an homage to some of their favourite songs, especially dedicated to their Latin influences. "Gente" turns out to be a breaking song and album. The title track became a hit.

Their latest album "Postales" changes the tone of their lyrics and brings in some social and pacifist topics. The band tours the new album in 2005, first with their usual band, then in an acoustic set tour on theatres and small venues.

Twenty years after their debut, Presuntos Implicados is one of the top groups in the Spanish music landscape. However, in February 2006, their singer, Sole Giménez announced she was leaving the band in May after the tour ends. Sole and Juan Luis both have solo careers (Juan Luis under different names and with a lot of more records). Nacho and Juan Luis are also top producers for many bands in Spain.

But Presuntos Implicados goes+ on with a new singer, Lydia. With her they publish "Será" in September 2008, which included 14 new songs.

Discography
Danzad, danzad malditos (Dance! Dance, Damn You!) (1985)
De sol a sol (From sunrise to sunset) (1987)
Alma de Blues (Soul of Blues) (1989)
Ser de Agua (Water being) (1991)
El pan y la sal (Bread and salt) (1994)
La noche (The night) (1995)
Siete (Seven) (1997)
Versión Original (Original version) (1999)
Gente (People) (2001)
Selección natural (Natural selection) (2002)
Postales (Postcards) (2005)
Será (It will be) (2008)
Banda Sonora  (2011)
La Noche 2 desde Ciudad de México (The Night 2 from México City) (2013/2014)

External links

Official Website in Spanish.
Fan Club homepage in Spanish.

Spanish musical groups
Latin pop music groups